Sadar Bazaar is a popular shopping destination for tourists visiting Agra.  It is located close to Agra Cantonment railway station and is in proximity to the Taj Mahal and Agra Fort.

Shopping
Taj Mahal being a popular attraction for tourism, thousands of tourists from different parts of India as well as from foreign countries come to Agra. Sadar Bazaar is the place most of them come to for shopping.  Shops in Sadar Bazaar sell leather products, petha (sweet), handicrafts and garments. The market sees heavy activity in the evening when the streets are filled with locals and foreigners alike.

See also

External links
Hotel Jai Hind

Economy of Agra
Bazaars in India
Neighbourhoods in Agra